"Bring Back My Soldier Boy to Me" is a World War I era song written by Walter Hirsch and composed by Frank Magine. The song was copyrighted by Al Piantadosi & Co., Inc., New York in 1918.

Reception
"Bring Back My Soldier Boy to Me" was released by Olive Kline in January 1919. The song peaked at number eight on song charts in the US.

Lyrics
First verse

Chorus

Second verse

References

External links
Audio file of Bring Back My Soldier Boy to Me 

1918 songs
Songs about soldiers
Songs of World War I
Olive Kline songs
Songs with lyrics by Walter Hirsch
Songs written by Frank Magine